Arthur Willoughby Barton (14 September 1899 – 24 August 1976) was a headmaster, academic author and association football referee.

Early life and education
Barton's father was Edwin H Barton, professor of physics at University College, Nottingham. He was educated at Nottingham High School and then Trinity College, Cambridge, after military service with the Royal Engineers.

He read natural sciences (physics) taking Firsts in Parts I and II; in 1922, he was awarded first-Class honours in physics in the London BSc examination. From 1922 to 1925 he was a research student at the Cavendish Laboratory in Lord Rutherford's group.

Career
Barton was Chief Physics Master at Repton School from 1926 until 1939, when Geoffrey Fisher, later Archbishop of Canterbury, was headmaster. While at Repton he was awarded a doctorate from the University of London for a thesis on radioactive decay (the measurement of the half-period of radium C).

In 1939, he was appointed headmaster of King Edward VII School, Sheffield (photo). From 1950 to 1965 he was headmaster of the City of London School.

Publications
Barton was the author of textbooks on heat and light, for example A Text Book on Heat (ASIN B000HIO678).

Sport
Barton was a football referee. He refereed the semi-final between Austria and Poland in the 1936 Summer Olympic Games in Berlin, and was linesman in the 1936 FA Cup Final between Arsenal and Sheffield United.

Personal life
In 1935 he married Alison Mary, second daughter of Colin Read Shaw.

References

 Obituary, The Times, Saturday 28 August 1976

External links
 
 
 

1899 births
People educated at Nottingham High School
Alumni of Trinity College, Cambridge
Alumni of the University of London
English physicists
English nuclear physicists
Heads of schools in Yorkshire
Heads of schools in London
English football referees
1976 deaths